John Joseph Sullivan (July 5, 1920 – February 11, 2001) was an American prelate of the Roman Catholic Church. He served as bishop of the Diocese of Grand Island in Nebraska (1972–1977) and bishop of the Diocese of Kansas City-St. Joseph in Missouri (1977–1993).

Biography

Early life 
John Sullivan was born on July 5, 1920, in Horton, Kansas, to Walter and Mary (née Berney) Sullivan. His father worked for the Electro-Motive Company. When he was age ten, his family to Oklahoma City, Oklahoma. He received his early education at the parochial schools of the Cathedral of Our Lady of Perpetual Help, where he also served as an altar boy to Bishop Francis Kelley. He attended St. Benedict's College in Atchison, Kansas, for two years before entering Kenrick Seminary in St. Louis, Missouri, in 1939.

Priesthood 
He was ordained to the priesthood by Bishop Albert Lewis Fletcher on September 23, 1944, for the Diocese of Oklahoma City-Tulsa.

Following his ordination, Sullivan became a curate at Holy Family Cathedral Parish in Tulsa. He also served as director of Catholic Activities and as chaplain at the University of Tulsa. Bishop Eugene J. McGuinness originally intended for Sullivan to study canon law at the Catholic University of America, but instead assigned him as pastor of St. Mary's Parish in Guthrie in 1947. While in Guthrie, he recruited college students to work as volunteers among the poor. Sullivan became pastor of St. James Parish in Oklahoma City in 1959. From 1961 to 1968, he was national director of lay volunteers for the Catholic Church Extension Society. Returning to Tulsa, he was made pastor of the Church of the Madalene Parish and episcopal vicar for Eastern Oklahoma.

Bishop of Grand Island 
On July 25, 1972, Sullivan was appointed the fifth bishop of the Diocese of Grand Island by Pope Paul VI. He received his episcopal consecration on September 19, 1972, from Archbishop John R. Quinn, with Bishops John L. May and Charles Buswell serving as co-consecrators. He was installed at the Cathedral of the Nativity of the Blessed Virgin Mary on September 21, 1972.

Bishop of Kansas City-Saint Joseph 
Sullivan was named the sixth Bishop of Kansas City-St. Joseph by Paul VI on June 27, 1977. He was installed on August 17, 1977. After being diagnosed with Parkinson's disease, petitioned the Vatican for early retirement.  Pope John Paul II accepted his retirement as bishop of Kansas City-Saint Joseph on June 22, 1993.

John Sullivan died on February 11, 2001, at the Jeanne Jugan Center in Kansas City, Missouri at age 80.

References

1920 births
2001 deaths
Kenrick–Glennon Seminary alumni
University of Tulsa people
People from Horton, Kansas
Roman Catholic Archdiocese of Oklahoma City
Roman Catholic bishops of Grand Island
Roman Catholic bishops of Kansas City–Saint Joseph
20th-century Roman Catholic bishops in the United States
Religious leaders from Oklahoma